Warren J. Schaeffer (born January 28, 1985) is an American professional baseball coach. He is the third base coach for the Colorado Rockies of Major League Baseball.

Career
Schaeffer is from Vandergrift, Pennsylvania. He attended Greensburg Central Catholic High School in Greensburg, Pennsylvania, where he played on the school's baseball team as a shortstop. He enrolled at Virginia Tech and played for the Virginia Tech Hokies. The Colorado Rockies selected Schaeffer in the 38th round of the 2007 MLB draft. He played in Minor League Baseball for the Rockies organization for six seasons.

After he retired, Schaeffer remained in the Rockies organization as a coach. Schaeffer was named the manager of the Asheville Tourists for the 2015 through 2017 seasons, and the Hartford Yard Goats for the 2018 and 2019 seasons. He was named the manager of the Albuquerque Isotopes for the 2020 season, which was cancelled due to the COVID-19 pandemic. He returned to manage Albuquerque in the 2021 and 2022 seasons.

After the 2022 season, the Rockies promoted Schaeffer to their major league coaching staff as their third base and infield coach.

Personal life
Schaeffer's wife, Callie (née Rhodes), played softball at Virginia Tech. They have two children.

References

External links

Living people
1985 births
People from Vandergrift, Pennsylvania
Baseball players from Pennsylvania
Virginia Tech Hokies baseball players
Asheville Tourists managers
Albuquerque Isotopes managers
Colorado Rockies (baseball) coaches
Major League Baseball third base coaches